Now and Forever is the seventh studio album by British-Australian soft rock group, Air Supply. released in 1982. It peaked at No. 25 on the US charts. The album contains the hit "Even the Nights Are Better" (#5), along with the minor hits "Young Love" (#38) and "Two Less Lonely People in the World" (#38).

Track listing 
 "Now and Forever" (Graham Russell) – 4:18
 "Even the Nights Are Better" (Terry Skinner, J.L. Wallace, Ken Bell) – 3:57
 "Young Love" (Russell) – 4:00
 "Two Less Lonely People in the World" (Howard Greenfield, Ken Hirsch) – 3:59
 "Taking the Chance" (Russell) – 4:13
 "Come What May" (Russell, Tom Snow, Cynthia Weil) – 3:56
 "One Step Closer" (Russell) – 3:49
 "Don't Be Afraid" (Frank Esler-Smith, Russell) – 3:20
 "She Never Heard Me Call" (Rex Goh, Russell) – 3:24
 "What Kind of Girl" (Goh, Russell) – 3:50

Personnel 
Air Supply

Graham Russell - lead vocals, rhythm guitar
Russell Hitchcock - lead vocals
Frank Esler-Smith - keyboard, orchestra arrangement, conductor
Ralph Cooper - drums
David Moyse - lead guitar
Rex Goh - lead guitar
Dave Green - bass

Production
 Produced and Engineered by Harry Maslin
 Assistant Engineers – Karen Hewitt and John Van Nest, Chris Pyne
 Recorded at Paradise Studios (Sydney, Australia).
 Mixed by Harry Maslin and John Van Nest at Allen Zentz Recording (Hollywood, CA).
 Mastered by Chris Bellman at Allen Zentz Mastering (San Clemente, CA).
 Art Direction – Donn Davenport
 Front Cover Photos – The Image Bank
 Back Cover Photos – Leon Lecash and Lindsay Matthews
 Styling – Cindy Lecash

Charts

References 

1982 albums
Air Supply albums
Arista Records albums